P. Amarasinghe was the former Deputy Governor of Central Bank of Sri Lanka and former Chairman of People's Bank (Sri Lanka).

Early childhood & education
After being educated at Nalanda College, Colombo Amarasinghe entered University of Ceylon and graduated with an Economics Degree with Honours. Later on obtained MSc in Economics from McMaster University in Canada. He is also a fellow of McGill University Canada Centre for Developing Area Studies, Fellow of Institute of Bankers of Sri Lanka.

Career
After graduation Amerasinghe joined Central Bank of Sri Lanka as an Economist. During his tenure, he had serverved as Senior Economist of Economic Research, Director Data Processing Superintendent of Public Debt, Controller of Exchange and an Executive Director.

P. Amarasinghe has also served as Chairman of the Institute of Bankers and the Credit Information Bureau of Sri Lanka.

General references

External links
 New People's Bank Chairman

Sri Lankan Buddhists
Alumni of Nalanda College, Colombo
Sri Lankan economists
Sri Lankan bankers
2007 deaths